Donna McNeil is an American arts advocate, author, and curator. She is the founding executive director of the Ellis-Beauregard Foundation and the former director of the Maine Arts Commission.

Early life and education  
McNeil was born in Würzburg, Germany. She was educated at Syracuse University, where she earned a bachelor of fine arts in painting and Harvard University, where she earned a master of arts in liberal studies focussed on art history. She holds an honorary Ph.D in Fine Arts from the Maine College of Art.

Career 
She was the co-director of Artists in Context and the former executive director of the Maine Arts Commission. She has served as a juror for the National Endowment for the Arts and MacArthur Foundation.

She is the author of the 2017 book There Has to Be Magic: The Art of Evelyn Kok, which was won the Excellence in Publishing award at the Maine Literary Awards in 2018. She also wrote Moser: Legacy in Wood about the Thos. Moser company, published in 2015.

Since 2017, McNeil has served as the executive founding director of the Ellis-Beauregard Foundation, an arts grant and residency in Rockland, Maine.

Books
There Has to Be Magic: The Art of Evelyn Kok, Maine Authors Publishing, 2017

Donna McNeil & Thomas Moser, Moser: Legacy in Wood, Down East Books, ISBN 978-1608936076, 2015

Personal life  
McNeil has spoken in support of reproductive freedom, describing her own experience with a pre-Roe v. Wade abortion in 1965.

Notes

References

External links 
 Donna McNeil - Instagram
 Ellis-Beauregard Foundation - official website

Living people
Women arts administrators
American women curators
Syracuse University alumni
21st-century American women writers
German emigrants to the United States
People from Würzburg
1940s births
Harvard Extension School alumni
Maine College of Art alumni